Omphalodes commutata is a flowering plant with a conical receptacle.

References

commutata